The canton of Les Coteaux de Moselle is an administrative division of the Moselle department, northeastern France. It was created at the French canton reorganisation which came into effect in March 2015. Its seat is in Moulins-lès-Metz.

It consists of the following communes:
 
Ancy-Dornot
Arry
Ars-sur-Moselle
Augny
Châtel-Saint-Germain
Coin-lès-Cuvry
Coin-sur-Seille
Corny-sur-Moselle
Cuvry
Féy
Gorze
Gravelotte
Jouy-aux-Arches
Jussy
Lessy
Lorry-lès-Metz
Lorry-Mardigny
Marieulles
Moulins-lès-Metz
Novéant-sur-Moselle
Pouilly
Pournoy-la-Chétive
Rezonville-Vionville
Rozérieulles
Sainte-Ruffine
Vaux
Vernéville

References

Cantons of Moselle (department)